H. P. Young was a university professor and American football player and coach. He served as the head football coach at Furman University from 1891 to 1895, compiling a record of 2–4. Young an 1887 graduate of Brown University.

Head coaching record

References

Year of birth missing
Year of death missing
19th-century players of American football
American football quarterbacks
Brown University alumni
Furman Paladins football coaches
Furman Paladins football players
Furman University faculty